Triam Udom Suksa Pattanakarn School (commonly abbreviated as Triampat, is a high school located in Bangkok, Thailand. It admits lower-secondary and upper-secondary students (mathayom 1–6, equivalent to grades 7–12). Founded in 1978 as a campus school of Triam Udom Suksa School, Bangkok, Thailand which is preparatory school for Chulalongkorn University. Triam Udom Suksa Pattanakarn School has among the top 3 highest university entry rates for Thai high-schools, and its students consistently score among the top in national standardized tests.

External links 
 Triam Udom Suksa Pattanakarn Official Website 
 Triam Udom Suksa Pattanakarn Student Community Website 

Schools in Bangkok
Educational institutions established in 1978
Suan Luang district